Over fifty films of William Shakespeare's Hamlet have been made since 1900. Seven post-war Hamlet films have had a theatrical release: Laurence Olivier's Hamlet of 1948; Grigori Kozintsev's 1964 Russian adaptation; a film of the John Gielgud-directed 1964 Broadway production, Richard Burton's Hamlet, which played limited engagements that same year; Tony Richardson's 1969 version (the first in colour) featuring Nicol Williamson as Hamlet and Anthony Hopkins as Claudius; Franco Zeffirelli's 1990 version starring Mel Gibson; Kenneth Branagh's full-text 1996 version; and Michael Almereyda's 2000 modernisation, starring Ethan Hawke.

Because of the play's length, most films of Hamlet are heavily cut, however Branagh's 1996 version used the full text.

Approaches
The full conflated text of Hamlet can run to four hours in performance, so most film adaptations are heavily cut, sometimes by removing entire characters. Fortinbras can be excised with minimal textual difficulty, and so a major decision for the director of Hamlet, on stage or on screen, is whether or not to include him. Excluding Fortinbras removes much of the play's political dimension, resulting in a more personal performance than those in which he is retained. Fortinbras makes no appearance in Olivier's and Zeffirelli's versions, while in Kozintsev's and Branagh's films he is a major presence.

Another significant decision for a director is whether to play up or play down the incestuous feelings that Freudian critics believe Hamlet harbours for his mother. Olivier and Zeffirelli highlight this interpretation of the plot (especially through casting decisions) while Kozintsev and Branagh avoid this interpretation.

Harry Keyishan has suggested that directors of Hamlet on screen invariably place it within one of the established film genres: Olivier's Hamlet, he claims, is a film noir; Zeffirelli's version is an action adventure and Branagh's is an epic. Keyishan adds that Hamlet films can also be classified by the auteur theory: Olivier's and Zeffirelli's Hamlets, for example, can be viewed among the body of their directorial work.

Significant theatrical releases

Laurence Olivier, 1948

This black and white British film of Hamlet was directed by and starred Laurence Olivier.  As in Olivier's previous Shakespeare adaptation, Henry V (1944), the film's score was composed by William Walton. It has received the most prestigious accolades of any Shakespeare film, winning the Academy Awards for Best Picture and Best Actor.

The film opens with Olivier's voiceover of his own interpretation of the play, which has been criticised as reductive: "This is the tragedy of a man who could not make up his mind." Olivier excised the "political" elements of the play (entirely cutting Fortinbras, Rosencrantz and Guildenstern) in favour of an intensely psychological performance. He played up the Oedipal overtones of the play, to the extent of casting the 28-year-old Eileen Herlie as Hamlet's mother, opposite himself (aged 41) as Hamlet. Film scholar Jack Jorgens has commented that "Hamlet's scenes with the Queen in her low-cut gowns are virtually love scenes." In contrast, Jean Simmons' Ophelia is destroyed by Hamlet's treatment of her in the nunnery scene: ending with her collapsing on the staircase in what Deborah Cartmell calls the position of a rape victim. According to J. Lawrence Guntner, the style of the film owes much to German Expressionism and to film noir: the cavernous sets featuring narrow winding stairwells correspond to the labyrinths of Hamlet's psyche.

Grigori Kozintsev, 1964

Hamlet is a 1964 film adaptation in Russian, based on a translation by Boris Pasternak and directed by Grigori Kozintsev, with a score by Dmitri Shostakovich. The film is heavily informed by the post-Stalinist era in which it was made, Pasternak and lead actor Innokenty Smoktunovsky having been imprisoned by Stalin. In contrast to Olivier's film, Kozintsev's is political and public. Where Olivier had narrow winding stairwells, Kozintsev had broad avenues, peopled with ambassadors and courtiers. The camera frequently looks through bars and grates, and J. Lawrence Guntner has suggested that the image of Ophelia in an iron farthingale symbolises the fate of the sensitive and intelligent in the film's tough political environment.

Kozintsev consistently cast actors whose first language was not Russian, so as to bring shades of other traditions into his film. Smoktunovsky's individual manner of acting distinguished the film from other versions, and his explosive behaviour in the recorder scene is viewed by many critics, as the film's climax. Douglas Brode has criticised the film for presenting a Hamlet who barely pauses for reflection: with most of the soliloquies cut, it is circumstances, not an inner conflict, that delay his revenge.

Tony Richardson, 1969

The first Hamlet filmed in colour, this film stars Nicol Williamson as Prince Hamlet. It was directed by Tony Richardson and based on his own stage production at the Roundhouse theatre in London. The film, a departure from big-budget Hollywood renditions of classics, was made with a small budget and a very minimalist set, consisting of Renaissance fixtures and costumes in a dark, shadowed space. A brick tunnel is used for the scenes on the battlements. The Ghost of Hamlet's father is represented only by a light shining on the observers. The version proved to be a critical and commercial failure: partly due to the decision to market the film as a tragic love story to teenage audiences who were still flocking to Franco Zeffirelli's 1968 Romeo and Juliet, and yet to cast opposite Marianne Faithfull's Ophelia the "balding, paunchy Williamson, who looked more like her father than her lover."

Franco Zeffirelli, 1990

Franco Zeffirelli's 1990 film of Hamlet stars Mel Gibson as the title character, with Glenn Close as Gertrude, Alan Bates as Claudius and Helena Bonham Carter as Ophelia.

Film scholar Deborah Cartmell has suggested that Zeffirelli's Shakespeare films are appealing because they are "sensual rather than cerebral", an approach by which he aims to make Shakespeare "even more popular". To this end, he cast the Hollywood actor Mel Gibson - then famous for the Mad Max and Lethal Weapon films - in the title role. Cartmell also notes that the text is drastically cut, with the effect of enhancing the roles of the women.

J. Lawrence Guntner has suggested that Zeffirelli's cinematography borrows heavily from the action film genre that made Gibson famous, noting that its average shot length is less than six seconds. In casting Gibson, the director has been said to have made the star's reputation part of the performance, encouraging the audience "to see the Gibson that they have come to expect from his other films". Indeed, Gibson was cast after Zeffirelli watched his character contemplate suicide in the first Lethal Weapon film. Harry Keyishan has suggested that Hamlet is well suited to this treatment, as it provides occasions for "enjoyable violence". J. Lawrence Guntner has written that the casting of Glenn Close as Mel Gibson's mother (only eleven years older than he was, in life, and then famous as the psychotic "other woman" in Fatal Attraction) highlights the incest theme, leaving "little to our post-Freudian imagination". and Deborah Cartmell notes that Close and Gibson simulate sex in the closet scene, and "she dies after sexually suggestive jerking movements, with Hamlet positioned on top of her, his face covered with sweat".

Kenneth Branagh, 1996

In contrast to Zeffirelli's heavily cut Hamlet of a few years before, Kenneth Branagh adapted, directed, and starred in a version containing every word of Shakespeare's play, running for around four hours. He based aspects of the staging on Adrian Noble's recent Royal Shakespeare Company production of the play, in which he had played the title role.

In a radical departure from previous Hamlet films, Branagh set the internal scenes in a vibrantly colourful setting, featuring a throne room dominated by mirrored doors; film scholar Samuel Crowl calls the setting "film noir with all the lights on." Branagh chose Victorian era costuming and furnishings, using Blenheim Palace, built in the early 18th century, as Elsinore Castle for the external scenes. Harry Keyishan has suggested that the film is structured as an epic, courting comparison with Ben Hur, The Ten Commandments and Doctor Zhivago. As J. Lawrence Guntner points out, comparisons with the latter film are heightened by the presence of Julie Christie (Zhivago's Lara) as Gertrude.

The film makes frequent use of flashbacks to dramatise elements that are not performed in Shakespeare's text, such as Hamlet's sexual relationship with Kate Winslet's Ophelia. These flashbacks include performances by several famous actors in non-speaking roles: Yorick is played by Ken Dodd, Old Norway by John Mills and John Gielgud as Priam and Judi Dench as Hecuba in a dramatisation of the Player King's speech about the fall of Troy.

Michael Almereyda, 2000

Directed by Michael Almereyda and set in contemporary Manhattan, this film stars Ethan Hawke, who plays Hamlet as a film student. It also features Julia Stiles as Ophelia, Liev Schreiber as Laertes, and Bill Murray as Polonius. In this version, Claudius becomes CEO of the "Denmark Corporation", having taken over the firm by killing his brother. The film is notable for its inclusion of modern technology: for example, the ghost of Hamlet's murdered father first appears on closed-circuit TV. The script is heavily cut, to suit the modern day surroundings. Ethan Hawke is the youngest of the big-screen Hamlets, at 27 when production began.

Other screen performances
In the late nineteenth and early twentieth centuries, the central character, Prince Hamlet, was perceived as effeminate; so it is fitting that the earliest screen success as Hamlet was Sarah Bernhardt in a one-minute film of the fencing scene, in 1900 for the Phono-Cinema Theater exhibit at the Paris 1900 Exhibition. The film had the novel feature of having the sound effects of swords clashing, which was synchronized from a Pathé cylinder to be played along with the film. Silent versions of the play were directed by Georges Méliès in 1907 (Hamlet), Luca Comerio in 1908, William George Barker in 1910, August Blom in 1910, Cecil Hepworth in 1913 and Eleuterio Rodolfi in 1917.

In 1920, Svend Gade directed Asta Nielsen in a version derived from Edward Vining's 1881 book "The Mystery of Hamlet", in which Hamlet is a woman who spends her life disguised as a man.

In Maximilian Schell's performance in Hamlet, Hamlet is an idealist activist standing up to Claudius' corrupt establishment. Karl Michael Vogler played Horatio. This version was successfully televised, but technical and dubbing issues caused it to be less successful on the English language big-screen. The English version is best remembered for being mocked on one of the final episodes of Mystery Science Theater 3000.

John Gielgud directed Richard Burton in a successful run of the play at the Lunt-Fontanne Theatre in 1964-5. A film of the production, Richard Burton's Hamlet played limited engagements in 1964. It was made using ELECTRONOVISION, which proved to be an ineffective hybrid of stage and screen methods, although its novelty value made the film a commercial success at the time.

Philip Saville directed Christopher Plummer in a TV version usually called Hamlet at Elsinore, filmed in black-and-white at Kronborg Slot, the castle at Elsinore where the play is set. It featured Michael Caine as Horatio and Robert Shaw as Claudius.

Richard Chamberlain was a rarity: an American actor in the central role of a UK Shakespeare production. His critically acclaimed television Hamlet was, in his words, "pressed into service as part of the student protest, with Hamlet as victim of the generation gap." While in England he took vocal coaching and in 1969 performed the title role in Hamlet for the Birmingham Repertory Theatre, becoming the first American to play the role there since John Barrymore in 1929. He received excellent notices and reprised the role for television, for The Hallmark Hall of Fame, in 1970.

The BBC Television Shakespeare was a project to televise the entire canon of plays. Their version of Hamlet starred Derek Jacobi as the prince and Patrick Stewart as Claudius.

S4C's Shakespeare: The Animated Tales series included a half-hour abridgement of Hamlet, featuring the voice of Nicholas Farrell as the Dane. The animator, Natalia Orlova, used an oil-on-glass technique: a scene would be painted and a number of frames would be shot, back-lit; then some paint would be scraped off and the scene partially repainted for the next frame. The effect has been described as "oddly both fluid and static ... capable of [representing] intense emotion."

Kevin Kline directed and starred in a production of Hamlet for the New York Shakespeare Festival which was televised in 1990 as part of the Great Performances anthology series on PBS.

Adapted from the successful Royal Shakespeare Company production, Hamlet, directed by Greg Doran and starring David Tennant as Prince Hamlet, was produced for BBC Two and the RSC by Illuminations Television. In addition to Tennant, the cast also featured Patrick Stewart as Claudius, as well as most of the cast of the original stage production. It aired on 26 December 2009 and was released on BBC DVD on 4 January 2010. This was the first Shakespeare work to be filmed on the pioneering RED camera system.

Adaptations
Edgar G. Ulmer's Strange Illusion was the first post-war film to adapt the Hamlet story, and was one of the earliest films to focus its attentions on a young character's psychology.

Hamlet has been adapted into stories which deal with civil corruption by the West German director Helmut Käutner in Der Rest ist Schweigen (The Rest is Silence) and by the Japanese director Akira Kurosawa in Warui Yatsu Hodo Yoku Nemuru (The Bad Sleep Well). In Claude Chabrol's Ophélia (France, 1962) the central character, Yvan, watches Olivier's Hamlet and convinces himself - wrongly, and with tragic results - that he is in Hamlet's situation. A Spaghetti Western version has been made: Johnny Hamlet directed by Enzo Castellari in 1968. Strange Brew (1983) is a movie featuring the comic fictional Canadians Bob and Doug MacKenzie (played by Rick Moranis and Dave Thomas). As stand-ins for the characters of Rosencrantz and Guildenstern, they investigate the manufacture of poisonous beer at the Elsinore Brewery where the prior owner has mysteriously died, and is now run by his brother Claude. Aki Kaurismäki's Hamlet Liikemaailmassa (Hamlet Goes Business) (Finland, 1987) piles on the irony: a sawmill owner is poisoned, and his brother plans to sell the mills to invest in rubber ducks.

Tom Stoppard directed a 1990 film version of his own play Rosencrantz & Guildenstern Are Dead, with Gary Oldman and Tim Roth in the title roles, which incorporates scenes from Hamlet starring Iain Glen as the Dane; Douglas Brode regards it as less successful on screen than it had been on stage, due to the preponderance of talk over action.

Tardid تردید (The Doubt) is a 2009 Iranian film directed and written  by Varuzh Karim Masihi. It is an adaptation of Hamlet, and is set in Modern Tehran .The film stars Bahram Radan, Taraneh Alidoosti  and Hamed Komeili.

Haider is a 2014 Bollywood film directed by Vishal Bhardwaj, and written by Basharat Peer and Bhardwaj.  It is an adaptation of Hamlet, and is set in Kashmir. The film stars Tabu, Shahid Kapoor as the eponymous protagonist, Shraddha Kapoor, and Kay Kay Menon.

The 2018 film Ophelia, directed by Claire McCarthy, follows the story of Hamlet from Ophelia's perspective. Based on the novel by Lisa Klein, it stars Daisy Ridley as Ophelia, George MacKay as Hamlet, Naomi Watts as Gertrude, and Clive Owen as Claudius.

Theatrical performances within films
Another way in which film-makers use Shakespearean texts is to feature characters who are actors performing those texts, within a wider non-Shakespearean story. Hamlet and Romeo and Juliet are the two plays which have most often been used in this way. Usually, Shakespeare's story has some parallel or resonance with the main plot. In the 1933 Katharine Hepburn film Morning Glory, for which she won her first Best Actress Academy Award, Hepburn's character Eva Lovelace becomes slightly drunk at a party and very effectively begins to recite To be or not to be, when she is rudely interrupted. In James Whale's 1937 fictional biopic The Great Garrick, Brian Aherne, as David Garrick, performs part of the final scene of Hamlet, in full eighteenth-century garb. In Ernst Lubitsch's 1942 To Be or Not to Be, the title soliloquy becomes a subtle running gag: whenever Jack Benny's character—the pompous actor Joseph Tura—begins the speech, a member of the audience loudly walks out: usually to make love to Tura's wife, played by Carole Lombard. In the 1955 film Prince of Players, a biography of Edwin Booth, Richard Burton appears in the title role and performs several scenes from Hamlet. The 1969 Robert Bresson film A Gentle Woman has the wife and husband attending a performance; in which we see the character Elle engrossed in the final scene of the play. Shelley Long's character plays Hamlet in the 1987 film Outrageous Fortune. Kenneth Branagh wrote and directed the low-budget In The Bleak Midwinter (released in the USA as A Midwinter's Tale) immediately before shooting his famous Hamlet. Shot in just 21 days, and telling the story of a group of actors performing Hamlet on a shoestring to save a village church, the film is a tribute to Ealing Comedies, and to the foibles of the acting profession, shot in black and white. The PBS documentary Discovering Hamlet is about the stage production that Branagh appeared in years before making the film, and includes scenes from that production. The film Hamlet 2 centers around a high school drama class and their teacher, played by Steve Coogan, attempting to stage a very experimental and controversial musical sequel to Hamlet.

The BFI National Archive contains at least twenty films featuring characters performing (sometimes brief) excerpts from Hamlet, including When Hungry Hamlet Fled (USA, 1915), Das Alte Gesetz (Germany, 1923), The Immortal Gentleman (GB, 1935), The Arizonian (USA, 1935), South Riding (GB, 1937), My Darling Clementine (USA, 1946), Hancock's 43 Minutes (GB, 1957), Danger Within (GB, 1958), The Pure Hell of St Trinian's (GB, 1960), Shakespeare Wallah (India, 1965), The Magic Christian (GB, 1969), Everything You Always Wanted to Know About Sex, But Were Afraid to Ask (USA, 1972), Theatre of Blood (GB, 1973), Mephisto (Hungary, 1981), An Englishman Abroad (GB, 1983), Withnail and I (GB, 1986), Comic Relief 2 (GB, 1989), Great Expectations (GB/USA, 1989), Hysteria 2 (GB, 1989), The Voice Over Queen (USA, 1990) and Tectonic Plates (GB, 1992).

List of screen performances

Silent Era

Sound films

{| class="wikitable"
|-
!Title
!FormatCountryYear
!Director
!Hamlet
! width=30% | Other roles
|- bgcolor=#e3e3e3
|Le Duel d'Hamlet
|ShortFrance1900
|Clément Maurice
|Sarah Bernhardt
|Pierre Magnier as Laertes
|-
|Khoon Ka Khoon
|FeatureIndia1935 - the first feature film of Hamlet with sound
|Sohrab Modi
|Sohrab Modi
|Naseem Banu as Ophelia
|- bgcolor=#e3e3e3
|Hamlet|FeatureUK1948
|Laurence Olivier
|Laurence Olivier
|Jean Simmons as OpheliaEileen Herlie as GertrudeBasil Sydney as ClaudiusFelix Aylmer as Polonius
|-
|Hallmark Hall of Fame: Hamlet (live TV performance, preserved on kinescope)
|TVUSA1953
|Albert McCleery
|Maurice Evans
|Joseph Schildkraut as ClaudiusRuth Chatterton as GertrudeSarah Churchill as OpheliaBarry Jones as Polonius
|- bgcolor=#e3e3e3
|Hamlet, Prinz von Dänemark|FeatureWest Germany1961
|Franz Peter Wirth
|Maximilian Schell
|
|-
|Hamlet at Elsinore|TVDenmark/UK1963
|Philip Saville
|Christopher Plummer
|Robert Shaw as ClaudiusMichael Caine as Horatio
|- bgcolor=#e3e3e3
|Hamlet (aka Gamlet)
|FeatureRussia1964
|Grigori Kozintsev
|Innokenti Smoktunovsky
|Anastasiya Vertinskaya as Ophelia
|-
|Hamlet (filmed Broadway play)
|ELECTRONOVISIONUSA1964
|John Gielgud
|Richard Burton
|Hume Cronyn as PoloniusEileen Herlie as Gertrude Alfred Drake as ClaudiusJohn Cullum as Laertes
|- bgcolor=#e3e3e3
|Hamlet (UK, 1969)
|FeatureUK1969
|Tony Richardson
|Nicol Williamson
|Marianne Faithfull as OpheliaAnthony Hopkins as ClaudiusJudy Parfitt as GertrudeMark Dignam as PoloniusGordon Jackson as Horatio.
|-
|Hallmark Hall of Fame: Hamlet (shot on videotape)
|TVUK/USA1970
|Peter Wood
|Richard Chamberlain
|Michael Redgrave as PoloniusJohn Gielgud as the Ghost Margaret Leighton as GertrudeRichard Johnson as ClaudiusCiaran Madden as Ophelia
|- bgcolor=#e3e3e3
|Hamlet|UK1976
|Celestino Coronado
|Anthony and David Meyer
|Helen Mirren as Gertrude and Ophelia
|-
|BBC Television Shakespeare: Hamlet (shot on videotape)Released in the USA as part of the "Complete Dramatic Works of William Shakespeare" series.
|TVUK1980
|Rodney Bennett
|Derek Jacobi
|Claire Bloom as GertrudePatrick Stewart as ClaudiusLalla Ward as OpheliaEric Porter as Polonius
|- bgcolor=#e3e3e3
|Hamlet|FeatureUSA1990
|Franco Zeffirelli
|Mel Gibson
|Helena Bonham Carter as OpheliaGlenn Close as GertrudeIan Holm as PoloniusAlan Bates as Claudius
|-
|New York Shakespeare Festival: Hamlet (shot on videotape)
|TVUSA1990
|Kirk Browning and Kevin Kline
|Kevin Kline
|Diane Venora as OpheliaDana Ivey as Gertrude
|- bgcolor=#e3e3e3
|The Animated Shakespeare: Hamlet|TVRussia/UK1992
|Natalia Orlova
|Nicholas Farrell (voice)
|-
|Hamlet|FeatureUK1996
|Kenneth Branagh
|Kenneth Branagh
|Kate Winslet as OpheliaDerek Jacobi as ClaudiusJulie Christie as GertrudeRichard Briers as Polonius
|- bgcolor=#e3e3e3
|Hamlet|TVUSA2000
|Campbell Scott
|Campbell Scott
|Blair Brown as GertrudeRoscoe Lee Browne as PoloniusLisa Gay Hamilton as OpheliaJamey Sheridan as Claudius
|-
|Hamlet|FeatureUSA2000
|Michael Almereyda
|Ethan Hawke
|Julia Stiles as OpheliaKyle MacLachlan as ClaudiusDiane Venora as GertrudeLiev Schreiber as LaertesBill Murray as Polonius
|- bgcolor=#e3e3e3
|Hamlet|VideoUK2003
|Mike Mundell
|William Houston
|Christopher Timothy as Gravedigger
|-
|The Tragedy of Hamlet Prince of Denmark|FeatureAustralia2007
|Oscar Redding
|Richard Pyros
|Heather Bolton as GertrudeBrian Lipson as PoloniusBeth Buchanan as OpheliaSteve Mouzakis as Claudius
|- bgcolor=#e3e3e3
|Hamlet|TVUK2009
|Gregory Doran
|David Tennant
|Penny Downie as GertrudeOliver Ford Davies as PoloniusMariah Gale as OpheliaPatrick Stewart as Claudius
|-
|Hamlet|FeatureCanada2011
|Bruce Ramsay
|Bruce Ramsay
|Lara Gilchrist as OpheliaPeter Winfield as ClaudiusGillian Barber as Gertrude
|}

List of screen adaptations
This list includes adaptations of the Hamlet story, and films in which the characters are involved in acting or studying Hamlet.
 Oh'Phelia (UK, 1919) animated burlesque of the Hamlet story.
Anson Dyer director
 To Be or Not To Be (USA, 1942) is the story of an acting company in 1939 Poland.
Ernst Lubitsch director
Jack Benny as Joseph Tura
Carole Lombard as Maria Tura
 The Bad Sleep Well (aka Warui yatsu hodo yoku nemuru) (Japan, 1960) is an adaptation of the Hamlet story set in corporate Japan.
Akira Kurosawa director
Toshiro Mifune as Koichi Nishi
 A Performance of Hamlet in the Village of Mrdusa Donja (Yugoslavia, 1974) Entered into the 24th Berlin International Film Festival.
Krsto Papić director
Rade Šerbedžija as Joco / Hamlet
 Angel of Revenge/Female Hamlet (Turkey, 1977)
Metin Erksan, director
Fatma Girik as a female Hamlet
 To Be or Not To Be (USA, 1983) is a remake of the Ernst Lubitsch film.
Mel Brooks director and as Frederick Bronski
Anne Bancroft as Anna Bronski
 Strange Brew (Canada, 1983), a comedy. Something is rotten in the Elsinore Brewery.
Dave Thomas co-director and as Doug McKenzie
Rick Moranis co-director and as Bob McKenzie
 Hamlet Goes Business (Hamlet liikemaailmassa) (Finland, 1987).
Aki Kaurismäki director
Pirkka-Pekka Petelius as Hamlet
 Rosencrantz & Guildenstern Are Dead (USA, 1990) film based on Tom Stoppard’s stage play.
Tom Stoppard director
Gary Oldman as Rozencrantz (or Guildenstern)
Tim Roth as Guildenstern (or Rozencrantz)
Richard Dreyfuss as the Player King
 Renaissance Man (USA, 1994) is the story of an unemployed advertising executive teaching Hamlet to a group of underachieving trainee soldiers.
Penny Marshall director
Danny DeVito as Bill
 The Lion King (USA, 1994) Disney’s animated adaptation of the Hamlet story.
Roger Allers and Rob Minkoff directors
Matthew Broderick as the voice of Simba (the Hamlet character)
James Earl Jones as the voice of Mufasa (the Old Hamlet character)
Jeremy Irons as the voice of Scar (the Claudius character)
Moira Kelly as the voice of Nala (the Ophelia character)
Madge Sinclair as the voice of Sarabi (the Gertrude character)
 In The Bleak Midwinter (aka “A Midwinter’s Tale”) (UK, 1996) tells the story of a group of actors performing Hamlet.
Kenneth Branagh director
Michael Maloney as Joe (Hamlet)
Julia Sawalha as Nina (Ophelia)
 Let the Devil Wear Black (USA, 1999)
Stacy Title director
Jonathan Penner as Jack Lyne (Hamlet)
Jamey Sheridan as Carl Lyne (Claudius)
Mary-Louise Parker as Julia Hirsch (Ophelia)
 The Banquet (China, 2006)
Feng Xiaogang, director
Zhang Ziyi as Empress Wan (Gertrude)
Daniel Wu as Prince Wu Luan (Hamlet)
Zhou Xun as Qing Nu (Ophelia)
Ge You as Emperor Li (Claudius)
 Haider (India, 2014) Hindi adaptation set in Kashmir.
Vishal Bhardwaj, director
Shahid Kapoor as Haider Mir(based on Hamlet)
Tabu as Ghazala Mir- Haider's mother (based on Gertrude)
Shraddha Kapoor as Arshia (based on Ophelia)
Kay Kay Menon as Khurram Mir-Haider's Uncle (based on Claudius)
 Ophelia (UK/USA, 2018) tells the story from Ophelia's perspective.
Claire McCarthy director
Daisy Ridley as Ophelia
George MacKay as Hamlet
Naomi Watts as Gertrude
Clive Owen as Claudius
 The Lion King (USA, 2019) Disney’s remake of the animated adaptation of the Hamlet story.
Jon Favreau director
Donald Glover as the voice of Simba (the Hamlet character)
James Earl Jones (reprising his role) as the voice of Mufasa (the Old Hamlet character)
Chiwetel Ejiofor as the voice of Scar (the Claudius character)
Beyonce as the voice of Nala (the Ophelia character)
Alfre Woodard as the voice of Sarabi (the Gertrude character)
 Sang-e-Mah'' (Pakistan, 2022) Urdu adaptation
Saife Hassan, director
Atif Aslam as Hilmand Khan (Hamlet)
Samiya Mumtaz as Zarsanga - Hilmand's mother (Gertrude)
Naumaan Ijaz as Haji Marjaan Khan-Hilmamd's stepfather (Claudius)

See also
 Shakespeare on screen
 Cultural references to Hamlet

Notes and references

Notes

References

Bibliography

 
 
 
 
 
 
 
 
 
 
 
 
 
 
 
 
 
 
 
 
 
 
 
 
 
 
 
 
 
 
 
 

Lists of films by source